Hidden in the Woods is a 2014 American thriller film directed by Patricio Valladares and starring Michael Biehn.  The film also stars Jennifer Blanc and William Forsythe.  It is a remake of Valladares' 2012 film of the same name.  Biehn and Blanc serve as producers of the film.

Plot
Hidden in the Woods tells the story of two sisters who have been raised in isolation, subjected to the torment of their abusive, drug dealing father. When they finally decide to report him to the police, he kills the two officers and is put in jail. But things go from bad to worse when the girls must answer to their Uncle Costello, a psychotic drug kingpin, who shows up looking for his missing merchandise which is hidden in the woods

Cast
Michael Biehn as Oscar Crooker
Jeannine Kaspar as Ana
Electra Avellan as Anny
Chris Browning as Jed James
William Forsythe as Uncle Costello

Production
The film was shot in Texas.

Reception
Luiz H.C. of Bloody Disgusting gave the film a mixed review and wrote "only the most desensitized of horror-hounds will enjoy this peculiar remake."  Matt Boiselle of Dread Central awarded the film two and a half stars out of five.

References

External links
 
 

2014 films
American psychological thriller films
American remakes of foreign films
2014 psychological thriller films
Incest in film
2010s English-language films
2010s American films